Karera Assembly constituency is one of the 230 Vidhan Sabha (Legislative Assembly) constituencies of Madhya Pradesh state in central India. This constituency is reserved for the candidates belonging to the Scheduled castes. This constituency came into existence in 1951, as one of the 79 Vidhan Sabha constituencies of the erstwhile Madhya Bharat state.

Overview
Karera (constituency number 23) is one of the 5 Vidhan Sabha constituencies located in Shivpuri district. This constituency covers the entire Karera tehsil and part of Narwar tehsil of the district.

Karera is part of Gwalior Lok Sabha constituency along with seven other Vidhan Sabha segments, namely, Pohari in this district and Gwalior Rural, Gwalior, Gwalior East, Gwalior South, Bhitarwar and Dabra in Gwalior district.

Members of Legislative Assembly

As a constituency of Madhya Bharat
 1951: Bhagwan Dass, Hindu Mahasabha

As a constituency of Madhya Pradesh

Election results

2013 election results
Source:

See also
 Karera

References

Shivpuri district
Assembly constituencies of Madhya Pradesh